Amy Kravitz is an independent filmmaker and teacher specializing in abstract animation. She is currently a Professor in the Film Department at the Rhode Island School of Design.

Work 
As a young girl, Amy Kravitz began making and teaching animation in Yvonne Andersen's famed Yellow Ball Workshop. Amy went on to obtain a B.A. in Social Anthropology from Harvard University, and received an MFA in Experimental Animation from the California Institute of the Arts. During her studies at CalArts, she was mentored under Sky David and Jules Engel. She taught Animation at Harvard and the School of the Museum of Fine Arts, Boston, before becoming a professor in the Film Department of the Rhode Island School of Design where she has taught Experimental Animation since the 1980s, and from time-to-time has served as the department chair.

Her film work includes River Lethe (1985), The Trap (1988), and Roost (1999). She states that her approach to filmmaking is "direct and visceral." Her films have been screened worldwide and have received numerous prizes and awards.

Amy's out-of-the-ordinary work as a teacher has been highly praised by her students and others in her field. Her long classes involve week-to-week problems and questions that students explore as a means to reveal and understand their perception of the world, instead of merely imparting a collection of animation techniques. Her students develop highly personalized relationships to the medium that bring out their own individual talents and points of view. Many of Kravitz's students have gone on to successful careers in traditional animation, computer animation, and interactive art.

In 2022, Kravitz was named the Honorary President of the Ottava International Animation Festival's return to an in-person festival after being virtual to previous two years.

Personal life 
Amy lives and works in Providence, Rhode Island with her husband, Steven Subotnick. She has two daughters.

Filmography 
River Lethe (1985)

The Trap (1988)

Roost (1999)

References

External links
 Amy Kravitz Vimeo page including complete films
Interview on Edge of Frame: http://www.edgeofframe.co.uk/amy-kravitz/
RISD Faculty Page: https://www.risd.edu/academics/film-animation-video/faculty/amy-kravitz
The Great Women Animators: http://greatwomenanimators.com/amy-kravitz/
Interview on Split Tooth Media: https://www.splittoothmedia.com/amy-kravitz/

Living people
Year of birth missing (living people)
American animators
American film directors
American animated film directors
Rhode Island School of Design faculty
Animation educators
Abstract animation
American women animators
Harvard University alumni
California Institute of the Arts alumni